Joachim von Amsberg may refer to:

Joachim von Amsberg (general) (1869–1945), German general
Joachim von Amsberg (colonel) (1903–1981), oberst in the Wehrmacht
Joachim von Amsberg (banker) (born 1964), German banker and a Vice President of the World Bank

See also
House of Amsberg